Andrew Douglas is a New Zealand rugby union coach and the former head coach of Old Glory DC of Major League Rugby (MLR).

Professional rugby career
Douglas has been involved in coaching in Oceania, North America, Europe and Asia with previous positions including both assistant coaching and head coaching assignments with the New Zealand Schools, coaching at under-19 level within the Waikato Rugby Union, and as assistant coach to their senior representative squad, including in the Mitre 10 Cup competition, and as a consultant with Super Rugby side, the Chiefs.

On 31 May 2017, Italian side Biella Rugby Club announced that Andrew Douglas was their new coach for their 2017-18 season. In Piedmont, Douglas guided Biella to promotion into Serie A in 2018. On 14 May 2018, just days after achieving promotion, he announced that he was leaving to take up a role as Attacking and Backs Coach for the Toyota Shuttles  of Japan's Top League, whom he joined for the 2018 season.

On 9 May 2019, newly created Major League Rugby outfit Old Glory DC announced that Douglas was hired as their coach for their inaugural 2019 season. With the team not expected to join MLR until the 2020 season, a series of exhibition games were arranged, with the New Zealander intended as being Head Coach for the duration. With Douglas at the helm, the team faced Ireland's Shannon, the Scotland U20s, Canada's Ontario Blues and the USA Rugby South Panthers respectively. While Old Glory lost the first two of these games, the campaign ultimately ended in a 2-2 record.

On 20 September 2019, Old Glory announced that Douglas had been hired as permanent Head Coach for the 2020 season with a contract running until 2021.

On 29 March 2022, Old Glory announced that Douglas is departing from the organization effective immediately. At the time of his departure Old Glory was ranked last in the Major League Rugby 2022 Eastern Conference and had lost all 7 games.

References

Living people
New Zealand rugby union coaches
Year of birth missing (living people)